Apollonaster is a genus of abyssal sea stars in the family Goniasteridae. They can be identified by their bare abactinal plate surfaces and multiple accessory granule rows on their abactinal plates. To date, Apollonaster has been found in the tropical Atlantic region (A. yucatanensis) and Hawaiian Islands region (A. kelleyi) oceans, with no other locations or species being known as of 2015.

Species list
According to World Register of Marine Species: 
 Apollonaster kelleyi Mah, 2015 -- Hawaii
 Apollonaster yucatanensis Halpern, 1970 -- Caribbean

This species was named in 1970 as a tribute to the Apollo mission.

References

External links

 Mah, C. (2014), Apollonaster Halpern, 1970 In: Mah, C.L. (2015) World Asteroidea database. Accessed through World Register of Marine Species.

Goniasteridae